Barbarigo may refer to:

People with the surname 
Barbarigo family, a noble family of the Republic of Venice
 Angelo Barbarigo (1350-1418), Italian Roman Catholic Cardinal
 Marco Barbarigo di Croia (fl. 1388–d. 1428), Venetian nobleman, ruler of Croia (Krujë) by marriage to Helena Thopia 
 Marco Barbarigo (1413-1486), Doge of Venice from 1485 to 1486
 Master of the Barbarigo Reliefs, Italian sculptor active around Venice between about 1486 and about 1515
 Agostino Barbarigo (1420-1501), Doge of Venice from 1486 to 1501, brother of Marco Barbarigo
 Jacomo Barbarigo (15th century), Venetian commentator and also the provveditore of Morea
 Agostino Barbarigo (1518–1571), Venetian nobleman, commander of the Christian left wing, during the Battle of Lepanto
 Jacopo Barbarigo (or Jacopo de' Barbari; 15-16th century), Italian painter and printmaker 
 Marcantonio Barbarigo, Venerable (1640–1706), Italian cardinal, founder of the Institute of the Religious Teachers Filippini 
 Saint Gregory Barbarigo (1625-1697), Cardinal of Padua
 Giovanni Francesco Barbarigo (1658–1730), Italian cardinal, nephew of Saint Gregorio Barbarigo
 Caterina Sagredo Barbarigo (fl. 1747), a Venetian aristocrat and salon holder
 Contarina Barbarigo (died 1804), Venetian noble

Buildings 
 Palazzo Barbarigo, a palace situated facing the Grand Canal of Venice, Italy
 Palazzo Barbarigo Minotto, a 15th-century palace on the Grand Canal in Venice
 Palazzo Barbarigo della Terrazza, a Baroque-style palace on the Grand Canal, Venice
 Villa Barbarigo, Noventa Vicentina, a patrician villa in the comune of Noventa Vicentina, Vicenza, northern Italy
 Villa Barbarigo (Valsanzibio), or Villa Barbarigo Pizzoni Ardemani, a 17th-century rural villa, south of Padua, Italy

Other uses 
 Italian submarine Agostino Barbarigo, launched in 1918
 Italian submarine Barbarigo, launched 1938; sunk 1943

Italian-language surnames